Grömbach is a municipality in the district of Freudenstadt in Baden-Württemberg in southern Germany.

References

Freudenstadt (district)
Württemberg